Sam Bennett (born December 21, 1999) is an American amateur golfer from Madisonville, Texas who is currently attending Texas A&M. In 2022, he won the U.S. Amateur.

Amateur career
Bennett began playing golf on a public nine-hole course in his native Madisonville. He attended Madisonville High School, where he was a state champion in 2016.

Bennett enrolled at Texas A&M in 2018. As a junior, he earned All-American honors and represented the American team at the 2021 Arnold Palmer Cup. He was the SEC Player of the Year as a senior in 2022 and was a finalist for the Fred Haskins Award, given to the most outstanding collegiate golfer in the country. He again was named to the 2022 Arnold Palmer Cup team and set a school record for lowest scoring average.

Bennett advanced to the final of the U.S. Amateur in August 2022 at Ridgewood Country Club in Paramus, New Jersey. He defeated Ben Carr, 1 up, to become the first U.S. Amateur champion in Texas A&M history. The win earned Bennett exemptions into the 2023 Masters and 2023 Open Championship.

Bennett qualified for the 2022 U.S. Open at The Country Club and made the cut, finishing in a tie for 49th place. He played his first PGA Tour event at the Valero Texas Open in 2021, missing the cut. He also played in the Arnold Palmer Invitational in March 2022.

Amateur wins
2021 Cabo Collegiate at TPC San Antonio, Old Waverly Collegiate, The Aggie Invitational, Sprint International Amateur Championship
2022 Louisiana Classics, U.S. Amateur
2023 John Burns Intercollegiate

Source:

Results in major championships

"T" indicates a tie for a place

U.S. national team appearances
Arnold Palmer Cup: 2021, 2022

Source:

References

American male golfers
Amateur golfers
Texas A&M Aggies men's golfers
Golfers from Texas
People from Madisonville, Texas
1999 births
Living people